Toxobotys boveyi is a moth in the family Crambidae. It was described by Hans Bänziger in 1987. It is found in Thailand.

The wingspan is 27–29 mm.

Etymology
The species is named for Prof. Dr. P. Bovey.

References

Moths described in 1987
Pyraustinae